Penicillium ramusculum is an anamorph, species of the genus of Penicillium.

References

Further reading 
 

 

ramusculum
Fungi described in 1955